Bardon Hill Football Club was a football club based in Bardon, near Coalville, Leicestershire, England. They played at Bardon Close.

History
The club was established in the 1890s as St Peters Church. They were later named Bardon Hill Granite and then Bardon Hill Sports. After playing in local leagues around Coalville, the club moved up to the Leicester & District League and the North Leicestershire League. In 1994 they joined Division One of the Leicestershire Senior League. After finishing as Division One runners-up in 2005–06 the club were promoted to the Premier Division.

In 2008 Bardon Hill Sports were founder members of the East Midlands Counties League. They were renamed Bardon Hill in 2010. The club won both the Leicestershire and Rutland Senior Cup and the East Midlands Counties League in 2014–15, earning promotion to the Premier Division of the Midland League. However, their first season in the Midland League ended in relegation to the Premier Division of the Leicestershire Senior League.

Despite finishing as runners-up in the Premier Division in 2017–18, Bardon Hill withdrew from the league at the end of the season due to a lack of personnel to run the club. The club continued to run its youth section.

Ground
The club moved to Bardon Close in 1990 as their previous ground behind the church was required for the expansion of a quarry.

Honours
East Midlands Counties League
Champions 2014–15
Leicestershire and Rutland Senior Cup
Winners 2014–15

Records
Best FA Cup performance: Second qualifying round, 2009–10
Best FA Vase performance: Second round, 2011–12

See also
Bardon Hill F.C. players

References

External links
Official website

Football clubs in England
Defunct football clubs in Leicestershire
Leicester and District Football League
North Leicestershire Football League
Leicestershire Senior League
East Midlands Counties Football League
Midland Football League
Defunct football clubs in England
Association football clubs disestablished in 2018
1890s establishments in England
Association football clubs established in the 19th century